Wareham may refer to:

Places
 Wareham, Dorset, England
 Wareham, Massachusetts, United States, a town
 Wareham, Minnesota, United States, an abandoned townsite
 Wareham, Newfoundland and Labrador, Canada
 Wareham, Ontario, Canada
 Wareham Island, Nunavut, Canada

People
 Andrew Wareham, British historian
 Arthur Wareham, British newspaper editor
 Dave Wareham, American basketball player
 Dean Wareham, New York-based musician with Galaxie 500, Luna, Dean and Britta
 Jack Wareham, English footballer
 Louise Wareham Leonard, American author
 Nicholas Wareham, British epidemiologist
 Pete Wareham, London-based saxophonist with Acoustic Ladyland, Polar Bear, Melt Yourself Down

See also 
 Warham (disambiguation)